Aidan McCarthy (born 2000) is an Irish hurler who plays as a forward for Clare Championship club Inagh-Kilnamona and at inter-county level with the Clare senior hurling team.

Honours

Inagh-Kilnamona
Clare Under-21 Hurling Championship: 2019

Clare
Munster Senior Hurling League: 2019

References

2000 births
Living people
Inagh-Kilnamona hurlers
Clare inter-county hurlers
Hurling forwards